, (Miyako: Sïmuzï) is one of the Miyako Islands, a part of the Ryukyu Islands. The island is administered by Miyakojima, Okinawa Prefecture, Japan. The island is connected to Irabu Island via .

Shimoji-shima is included within the Irabu Prefectural Natural Park and is the main setting for the anime series Stratos 4.

Shimojishima Airport is located on the island.

Climate

See also 
 Irabu Island

References

Miyako Islands
Islands of Okinawa Prefecture